John Ford Coley (born October 13, 1948) is an American singer, classically trained pianist, guitarist, actor, and author most known for his partnership in the musical duo England Dan & John Ford Coley.

Early life
Coley was born John Edward Colley in Dallas, Texas, United States. He grew up listening to the Grand Ole Opry, early rock and roll, singing church hymns and was trained as a classical pianist. At 16, while at W. W. Samuell High School in Dallas, Coley, along with schoolmate Dan Seals, joined the group Theze Few, which later became Southwest F.O.B. and toured the Texas music scene where they had one hit, "The Smell of Incense", which in 1969 rose to number 43 on the charts. This band played on the bill with Led Zeppelin and other acts.
 
While in the band, Seals and Coley began their own acoustic act, Colley and Wayland. The act was renamed England Dan & John Ford Coley, and the duo was signed by A&M Records. In 1971, the two moved to Los Angeles where they opened for numerous bands. Their first break came in 1972 with the song "Simone". It became a number one hit in Japan and was popular in France. However, "Simone" did not fare as well in the United States, and the two were released from their contract with A&M after three albums.

Signing to Atlantic Records
Two years later, they acquired another record deal from Atlantic Records subsidiary Big Tree Records and released the song "I'd Really Love to See You Tonight". Overall they had four top-ten hits and two top-twenty hits. They were nominated for a Grammy Award, received triple-platinum and gold records and released eight albums; additionally, other recordings were released abroad.

The duo disbanded in 1980.

After the 1980s
Coley formed another group that released an album on A&M Records: Leslie, Kelly and John Ford Coley (featuring sisters Leslie and Kelly Bulkin). He acted in teen films in the 1980s, acquired a small ranch in the 1990s, and wrote songs for film and television. He returned to touring in 1996. Coley plays with groups and artists including Ambrosia and Terry Sylvester (formerly of The Hollies), Three Dog Night, Lou Gramm (of Foreigner), Christopher Cross, Poco, Stephen Bishop, Al Stewart, Edgar Winter and others.

In 1996, Coley made a trip south for Tin Pan South and began making trips to Nashville to be part of the music community. He moved his family and horses across country to Tennessee in 1999. While in Tennessee, Coley, once a Baháʼí, converted back to Christianity. Coley continues to perform internationally.

On August 11, 1997, a handyman in Long Island, New York was arrested for impersonating Coley.

Discography

Albums
Smell of Incense - Southwest F.O.B., 1969
England Dan and John Ford Coley - England Dan and John Ford Coley, 1971
Fables - England Dan and John Ford Coley, 1972
I Hear Music - England Dan and John Ford Coley, 1976
Nights Are Forever - England Dan and John Ford Coley, 1976
Dowdy Ferry Road - England Dan and John Ford Coley, 1977
Some Things Don't Come Easy - England Dan and John Ford Coley, 1978
Dr. Heckle and Mr. Jive - England Dan and John Ford Coley, 1979
Just Tell Me You Love Me - England Dan and John Ford Coley, 1980
Leslie, Kelly and John Ford Coley - Leslie, Kelly and John Ford Coley, 1980 (A&M Records)
The Best of England Dan and John Ford Coley - England Dan and John Ford Coley, 1980
Live from the Philippines - John Ford Coley, 2009
Eclectic - John Ford Coley, 2016
Long Way Home (Live in Israel & L.A. - John Ford Coley, 2020

References

External links
 

1948 births
American country guitarists
American country pianists
American male pianists
American folk guitarists
American male guitarists
American male singer-songwriters
American soft rock musicians
England Dan & John Ford Coley members
Former Bahá'ís
Converts to Christianity
American Christians
Guitarists from Texas
Musicians from Dallas
Singer-songwriters from Texas
Living people
20th-century American guitarists
20th-century American pianists
20th-century American male singers
20th-century American singers
Big Tree Records artists